Marquel Lee (born October 21, 1995) is an American football linebacker who is currently a free agent. He played college football at Wake Forest, and was drafted by the Oakland Raiders in the fifth round of the 2017 NFL Draft.

Early life
Lee was born in Baltimore, Maryland in 1995. His family moved to Waldorf Maryland and he attended Westlake High School.

Professional career
On December 14, 2016, it was announced that Lee had accepted his invitation to play in the 2017 East–West Shrine Game. During practice for the East–West Shrine Game, Lee sustained a foot injury and was unable to participate. He was one of 29 collegiate linebackers to attend the NFL Scouting Combine in Indianapolis, Indiana, but only performed the bench press, vertical jump, and broad jump due to his pre-existing foot injury. Lee performed well, finishing second among all linebackers in the bench press, 12th in the broad jump, and 16th in the vertical. On March 13, 2017, Lee attended Wake Forest's pro day and ran all of the combine drills he was unable to at the combine. At the conclusion of the pre-draft process, Lee was projected to be a fifth round pick by NFL draft experts and scouts. He was ranked the 13th best outside linebacker prospect in the draft by NFLDraftScout.com.

Oakland Raiders
The Oakland Raiders selected Lee in the fifth round (168th overall) of the 2017 NFL Draft. He was the 22nd linebacker selected in 2017 and was the only Wake Forest player drafted since 2015.

On May 26, 2017,  the Oakland Raiders signed Lee to a four-year, $2.65 million contract that includes a signing bonus of $253,963.

Throughout training camp, Lee competed for the starting middle linebacker role against Ben Heeney, Cory James, and Tyrell Adams. Head coach Jack Del Rio named him the starting middle linebacker to start the regular season.

He made his professional regular season debut and his first career start in the Oakland Raiders' season-opener at the Tennessee Titans and recorded two solo tackles during their 26–16 victory. On October 8, 2017, Lee recorded a season-high six combined tackles in a 30–17 loss to the Baltimore Ravens. He unfortunately sustained a ankle injury during the game and was carted off the field to be examined in the locker room. He missed the next three games and lost his starting role to newly acquired veteran NaVorro Bowman who the Raiders signed on October 16, 2017. He finished his rookie season with 25 combined tackles (18 solo) in 13 games and six starts. Head coach Jack Del Rio was fired after the Raiders finished 6-10.

On September 24, 2019, Lee was placed on injured reserve. He was designated for return from injured reserve on November 11, 2019, and began practicing with the team again. He was activated on December 2, 2019. He was placed back on injured reserve on December 21, 2019.

Lee was placed on the active/physically unable to perform list at the start of training camp on July 28, 2020. He was waived with a failed physical designation on August 3, 2020.

Buffalo Bills
Lee signed a one-year contract with the Buffalo Bills on March 31, 2021. He was released on August 31, 2021.

Las Vegas Raiders
On September 1, 2021, Lee was signed to the Las Vegas Raiders practice squad. He was promoted to the active roster on September 18, 2021. He was released on September 22, 2021 and re-signed to the practice squad. He was promoted back to the active roster on November 3.

Buffalo Bills (second stint)
On March 18, 2022, the Buffalo Bills signed Lee to a one year contract. He was released on August 16, 2022.

References

External links
Wake Forest Demon Deacons bio
Las Vegas Raiders bio

1995 births
Living people
American football linebackers
Buffalo Bills players
Las Vegas Raiders players
Oakland Raiders players
People from Waldorf, Maryland
Players of American football from Maryland
Sportspeople from the Washington metropolitan area
Wake Forest Demon Deacons football players